The Lord Mansion is a historic house at 20 Summer Street (Maine State Route 35) in Kennebunk, Maine.  The multi-part house includes a 1760 Georgian house as an ell to its main element, an 1801 Federal period structure.  The house was listed on the National Register of Historic Places in 1973 for its architectural significance; it is also a contributing element to the Kennebunk Historic District.

Description and history
The Lord Mansion is located on the north side of Summer Street, opposite its junction with Park Street.  The house consists of multiple sections, roughly oriented from west to east, set back from the road on landscaped grounds above a retaining wall.  The main house is a roughly square two-story wood-frame structure, with a hip roof, and flushboard on the main (west-facing) facade and clapboards elsewhere.  The front facade is adorned with pilasters at the corners and on both sides of the entrance, where they rise all the way to the roof line.  The entrance is framed by sidelight windows, with a fanlight window above.  A three-part window is on the second level above the entrance, and there is a gabled dormer-like section on the roofline, which has a decorative carved fan.  The roof is encircled by a low balustrade.  Attached to the rear (east) of this block is a -story five-bay hip-roof block that is the oldest part of the house.

The first portion of the house was built about 1760 by Jonathan Banks.  He sold the house in 1789 to Jonas Clark, a local judge, who in 1801 built what is now the main portion of the house.  The house was purchased in 1822 by William Lord, a shipbuilder, and has remained in his family.  The house is locally distinctive for its combination of well-preserved colonial and Federal period elements.

See also
National Register of Historic Places listings in York County, Maine

References

Houses on the National Register of Historic Places in Maine
Colonial architecture in the United States
Federal architecture in Maine
Houses completed in 1760
Houses in York County, Maine
Buildings and structures in Kennebunk, Maine
National Register of Historic Places in York County, Maine
Historic district contributing properties in Maine